Permanent resident in Singapore is an immigration status in Singapore, second only to Singapore citizens in terms of privilege enjoyed. Singapore Permanent Resident (PR) have most of the rights, privileges, obligations, and responsibilities that citizens do, including National Service (NS) obligations (only applicable to second generation males and first generation males applying as students) and compulsory Central Provident Fund (CPF) contributions. Notable exceptions include not being able to vote or to hold public office, more limited public benefits such as medical and housing benefits, lower public (government and government-aided) school placement priority, and some limits on driving for transport services.

Singapore PRs are permitted to live, work, study, and retire in Singapore without any time limit. PR status is robust in practice but not absolute. PRs are subject to Re-Entry Permit (REP) requirements if they wish to leave Singapore for any length of time for any reason. If a PR leaves Singapore without a valid REP, or if a PR is outside Singapore when his/her REP expires, that individual's PR status automatically and, with rare exceptions, irrevocably ends. Singapore's Immigration and Checkpoints Authority (ICA) generally renews REPs for every 5 years, subject to PRs demonstrating their actual residence and economic or other relevant activity in Singapore.

Starting in 2010, Singapore has set an approximately 30,000 annual cap on the number of individuals being granted Permanent Residence. There is a relatively stable population of just over 500,000 PRs in Singapore.

Individuals eligible to apply for Singapore PR include:
 spouses and unmarried children (below 21 years old) of Singapore citizens or permanent residents
 aged parents and legal guardians of Singapore citizens
 foreign workers in Singapore possessing valid work passes (Employment Pass, S-Pass), and their dependents (with some exceptions)
 students studying in Singapore 
 investors and entrepreneurs 

Singapore's Immigration and Checkpoints Authority (ICA) processes PR applications in three different schemes: Family Ties, Professionals/Technical Personnel and Skilled Workers (PTS), and the Global Investor Programme (GIP). ICA receives applications through an online system, and applicants must pay a nonrefundable processing fee. Nobody has an automatic legal right to PR status; the government's PR decisions are entirely discretionary. The government does not disclose its evaluation criteria or decision processes beyond broad generalities, such as long-term citizen population-related goals. One of the government's stated public policy goals is to maintain relative stability in Singapore's racial and ethnic population proportions in order to promote and maintain racial harmony. Consequently, a PR applicant's family, cultural and ethnic background all influence ICA's decisions. According to ICA, the processing time of PR application is around 6 months, but varies based on the complexity of the case. The processing fee is S$100, which is not refundable. 

PR status is central to Singapore nationality law since naturalization as a Singaporean citizen requires that the applicant first be a Permanent Resident. PRs can apply for citizenship if at least two years have passed since being granted PR.

PRs (age 15 and older) are issued blue colored National Registration Identity Cards (NRICs).

Benefits and limitations 
Benefits of permanent resident status include:

 Travel, stay, work in Singapore without restrictions.
 Apply for a long-term visa for your parents.
 Get high priority for loan applications and purchase property as a PR holder.
 Be eligible to apply for full Singapore citizenship after several years of holding permanent residency status.
 Educate your children in both government and private schools.

References

See also 
 Immigration to Singapore
 Singaporean nationality law
 Singapore passport

Immigration to Singapore
Residence permit